"In the Hall of the Mountain King" is a piece of orchestral music composed by Edvard Grieg in 1875 as incidental music for the sixth scene of act 2 in Henrik Ibsen's 1867 play Peer Gynt. It was originally part of Opus 23 but was later extracted as the final piece of Peer Gynt, Suite No. 1, Op. 46. Its easily recognizable theme has helped it attain iconic status in popular culture, where it has been arranged by many artists (See Grieg's music in popular culture).

The English translation of the name is not literal. Dovre is a mountainous region in Norway, and "gubbe" translates into (old) man or husband. "Gubbe" is used along with its female counterpart "kjerring" to differentiate male and female trolls, "trollgubbe" and "trollkjerring". In the play, Dovregubben is a troll king that Peer Gynt invents in a fantasy.

Setting

The piece is played as the title character Peer Gynt, in a dream-like fantasy, enters "Dovregubbens (the troll Mountain King's) hall". The scene's introduction continues: "There is a great crowd of troll courtiers, gnomes and goblins. Dovregubben sits on his throne, with crown and sceptre, surrounded by his children and relatives. Peer Gynt stands before him. There is a tremendous uproar in the hall." The lines sung are the first lines in the scene.

Grieg himself wrote, "For the Hall of the Mountain King, I have written something that so reeks of cowpats, ultra-Norwegianism, and 'to-thyself-be-enough-ness' that I cannot bear to hear it, though I hope that the irony will make itself felt." The theme of "to thyself be... enough" – avoiding the commitment implicit in the phrase "To thine own self be true" and just doing enough – is central to Peer Gynts satire, and the phrase is discussed by Peer and the mountain king in the scene which follows the piece.

Music 

The piece is in the overall key of B minor. The simple theme begins slowly and quietly in the lowest registers of the orchestra, played first by the cellos, double basses, and bassoons. After being stated, the main theme is then very slightly modified with a few different ascending notes, but transposed up a perfect fifth (to the key of F-sharp major, the dominant key, but with flattened sixth) and played on different instruments.

The two groups of instruments then move in and out of different octaves until they eventually "collide" with each other at the same pitch. The tempo gradually speeds up to a prestissimo finale, and the music itself becomes increasingly loud and frenetic.

Lyrics of the song in Peer Gynt

See also

 Grieg's music in popular culture

Notes

Sources

Further reading

External links
 
 

Compositions by Edvard Grieg
1875 compositions
Theme music
Fictional trolls
Goblins
Compositions for symphony orchestra
Compositions in B minor
Peer Gynt (Grieg)
Madness (band) songs